Palm butter can refer to:

Palm butter, a rendering of oil palm fruit used for food and cosmetic purposes
Palm butter, another name for Moambe or Nyembwe, a western Middle African sauce also made of oil palm fruit
A spread made of palm oil designed to imitate dairy butter